Thomas Moore (born 1864 – died before 1945) was a Scottish footballer who played in the Football League for Stoke.

Career
Moore was signed by his local side Arbroath in 1887. He moved south to England to join Stoke in August 1888. Moore made his Stoke and League debut, on 13 October 1888, at Pike's Lane the then home of Bolton Wanderers. Stoke lost 2–1. This was his only appearance for Stoke and he and returned to Arbroath in January 1889.

He died before 1945.

Career statistics

References

Scottish footballers
Arbroath F.C. players
Stoke City F.C. players
English Football League players
Year of death missing
1864 births
Association football forwards